Robert of Courtenay, born ( – 1239 Palestine) was lord of Champignelles and grandson of Louis VI of France.
Robert de Courtenay was the seventh child of ten children of Peter I of Courtenay (1126 – 1183) and his wife, Elizabeth de Courtenay. Robert took part in the conquest of Normandy in 1204. During the siege of Château Gaillard, he fought alongside his cousin Philip II of France. In 1228, he left for a crusade to the Holy Land, where he died eleven years later in Palestine.

Marriages and issue 
Robert de Courtenay married twice. They had two daughters:
 Agnes de Courtenay (1204 – 1206), married Gibaud III de Saint-Vérain. 
 Clémence de Courtenay

Robert married secondly to Mathilde de Mehun (c. 1195 – 1240), daughter of Philippe de Mehun sur Yèvres. Robert and Mathilde married sometime around 1216 or 10 December 1218. Their marriage produced eight children:
 Pierre II de Courtenay (b. 1218 – d. 1249)
 Blanche de Courtenay, dame de Bléneau (b. 1218 – d. 1240)
 Philippe de Courtenay, seigneur de Champignelles (d. 1245)
 Isabelle de Courtenay (b. 1219 – d. 1256)
 Raoul I de Courtenay, seigneur d'Illiers (b. 1223 – d. 1271)
 Robert de Courtenay, seigneur de Danville et Nonancourt (b. 1224 – d. 1279)
 Jean I de Courtenay (d. 1276)
 Guillaume de Courtenay, seigneur de Venisy (b. 1228 – d. 1280)

References 

Robert
Lords of France
Christians of the Barons' Crusade

1160s births

1239 deaths
Year of birth uncertain